Shivam Kumar (born 7 August 2000) is an Indian cricketer. He made his List A debut on 7 October 2019, for Bihar in the 2019–20 Vijay Hazare Trophy. He made his Twenty20 debut on 8 November 2019, for Bihar in the 2019–20 Syed Mushtaq Ali Trophy. He made his first-class debut on 9 December 2019, for Bihar in the 2019–20 Ranji Trophy.

References

External links
 

2000 births
Living people
Indian cricketers
Bihar cricketers
Place of birth missing (living people)